Following is an incomplete list of law reviews currently or previously published in the United States.  The List of law schools in the United States includes additional schools which may publish a law review or other legal journal.

There are several different ways by which law reviews are ranked against one another, but the most commonly cited ranking is the Washington & Lee Law Journal Ranking.

By topic

General

 Arizona State Law Journal
 Albany Law Review, successor to the Albany Law School Journal
 Baylor Law Review
 British Journal of American Legal Studies
 BYU Law Review
 Buffalo Law Review
 California Law Review
 Cardozo Law Review
 Catholic University Law Review
 Columbia Law Review, successor to the Columbia Jurist
 Connecticut Law Review
 Dartmouth Law Journal
 Denver Law Review
 Duke Law Journal
 Emory Law Journal
 FIU Law Review
 Florida Law Review
 Fordham Law Review
 George Mason Law Review
 George Washington Law Review
 Georgetown Law Journal
 Georgia Law Review
 Georgia State University Law Review
 Harvard Law Review
 Hastings Law Journal
 Houston Law Review
 Indiana Law Journal
 Iowa Law Review
 Lewis & Clark Law Review
 Marquette Law Review
 Mercer Law Review
 Michigan Law Review
 Minnesota Law Review
 Mississippi Law Journal
 Mitchell Hamline Law Review
 New England Law Review
 New Mexico Law Review
 New York University Law Review
 North Carolina Law Review
 Northeastern University Law Journal
 Northwestern University Law Review
 Notre Dame Law Review
 Ohio Northern University Law Review
 Oregon Law Review
 Penn State Law Review
 Pepperdine Law Review
 Rutgers University Law Review
 South Carolina Law Review
 South Texas Law Review
 Southern California Law Review
 St. John's Law Review
 St. Mary's Law Journal
 Stanford Law Review
 Syracuse Law Review
 Tennessee Law Review
 Texas Law Review
 Tulane Law Review
 UCLA Law Review
 University of Chicago Law Review
 University of Florida Law Review
 University of Illinois Law Review
 University of Miami Law Review
 University of Pennsylvania Law Review
 University of Pittsburgh Law Review
 Vanderbilt Law Review
 Virginia Law Review
 Wake Forest Law Review
 Washington University Law Review
 West Virginia Law Review
 Widener Law Review
 Willamette Law Review
 Yale Law Journal

Administrative law

 Administrative Law Review
 Texas Tech Administrative Law Journal
 Yale Journal on Regulation

Business and commercial law

 American Bankruptcy Institute Law Review
 Civil Law Commentaries

Constitutional law

 Duke Journal of Constitutional Law & Public Policy
 First Amendment Law Review
 George Mason University Civil Rights Law Journal
 Harvard Civil Rights-Civil Liberties Law Review
 Harvard Journal on Legislation
 Hastings Constitutional Law Quarterly
 Publius: The Journal of Federalism
 Texas Journal on Civil Liberties & Civil Rights
 University of Pennsylvania Journal of Constitutional Law
 Alabama Civil Rights & Civil Liberties Law Review

Criminal law

 American Criminal Law Review
 Journal of Criminal Law & Criminology

Environmental law

 Arizona Journal of Environmental Law and Policy
 Columbia Journal of Environmental Law
 University of Denver Water Law Review
 Ecology Law Quarterly
 Environmental Law
 Environs: Environmental Law and Policy Journal
 Fordham Environmental Law Review
 Georgetown International Environmental Law Review
 Harvard Environmental Law Review
 Hastings West-Northwest Journal of Environmental Law and Policy
 Journal of Environmental Law and Litigation
 Journal of Land Use and Environmental Law
 LSU Journal of Energy Law and Resources
 Michigan Journal of Environmental and Administrative Law
 San Diego Journal of Climate and Energy Law
 Stanford Environmental Law Journal
 Tulane Environmental Law Journal
 UCLA Journal of Environmental Law and Policy
 Virginia Environmental Law Journal
 Willamette Environmental Law Journal

International law

Labor law

Public law

 Albany Government Law Review
 BYU Journal of Public Law
 Connecticut Public Interest Law Journal
 Cornell Journal of Law and Public Policy
 Georgetown Journal of Law and Public Policy
 Harvard Journal of Law and Public Policy
 Harvard Law and Policy Review
 Journal of Legislation
 Journal of Legislation and Public Policy
 Notre Dame Journal of Law, Ethics & Public Policy
 Psychology, Public Policy and Law
 Rutgers Journal of Law & Public Policy
 Texas Review of Law and Politics
 The Urban Lawyer
 Widener Journal of Law and Public Policy

Science and technology

 Albany Law Journal of Science and Technology
 Harvard Journal of Law & Technology
 Jurimetrics
 Journal of Intellectual Property and Entertainment Law
 Northwestern Journal of Technology and Intellectual Property
 Pittsburgh Journal of Technology Law & Policy
 University of Florida Journal of Technology Law and Policy

Sports 

 Arizona State Sports and Entertainment Law Journal
 Sports Lawyers Journal
 Texas Review of Entertainment & Sports Law
 Willamette Sports Law Journal

Other

 American Journal of Comparative Law
 American Journal of Legal History
 Animal Law Review
 Cardozo Arts & Entertainment Law Journal
 Chicago-Kent Journal of Intellectual Property
 Columbia Business Law Review
 Columbia Human Rights Law Review
 Columbia Journal of Law & the Arts
 Columbia Journal of Tax Law
 Construction Law Journal
 FIU World Arbitration and Mediation Review
 Fordham Intellectual Property, Media & Entertainment Law Journal
 Florida State University Business Review
 Harvard Human Rights Journal
 Houston Business and Tax Law Journal
 Houston Journal of Health Law & Policy
 Immigration and Nationality Law Review
 Indiana Health Law Review
 Journal of Business, Entrepreneurship and the Law
 Journal of Catholic Legal Studies
 Journal of Competition Law & Economics
 Journal of Intellectual Property Law & Practice
 Journal of Law and Commerce
 The Journal of Law and Economics
 Journal of Law & Politics
 Journal of Law and Religion
 The Journal of Legal Studies
 Journal of Technology Law & Policy
 Law & Critique
 Law and Inequality
 Law and Human Behavior
 Law & Society Review
 Loyola Consumer Law Review
 Medical Law International
 Nanotechnology Law & Business
 New York University Journal of Law & Liberty
 NYU Annual Survey of American Law
 NYU Journal of Law & Business
 Pittsburgh Tax Review
 The Review of Litigation
 Supreme Court Economic Review
 Supreme Court Review
 The Jurist
 Tribal Law Journal
 Tulane European and Civil Law Forum
 Tulane Journal of Law & Sexuality
 Tulane Journal of Technology and Intellectual Property
 Tulane Maritime Law Journal
 University of Michigan Journal of Law Reform
 University of San Francisco Maritime Law Journal
 Virginia Tax Review
 Vanderbilt Journal of Transnational Law
 Wake Forest Intellectual Property Law Journal
 Washington University Global Studies Law Review
 Washington University Journal of Law and Policy
 Washington University Jurisprudence Review
 Willamette Journal of Social Justice and Equity
 Women's Rights Law Reporter

See also
 Law review

References

 
United States law-related lists
Lists of academic journals